The Women's 3000 metres steeplechase at the 2014 Commonwealth Games, as part of the athletics programme, was held at Hampden Park on 30 July 2014.

Results

References

Women's 3000 metres steeplechase
2014
2014 in women's athletics